The Perfect Girl is a 2017 Taiwanese thriller film directed by Remus Kam and adapted from Ye Congling's 2007 web novel of the same name. The film stars Ray Chang, Tia Lee and Hsieh Tsu-wu.

Premise
Yeh Hsin is a top student in criminal psychology while her father is a distinguished cardiologist. Her boyfriend, Lin Miao, is a young forensic specialist. Everything seems perfect for Yeh Hsin until human remains are discovered in her backyard one rainy night. Around the same time Yeh receives a mysterious letter warning her that her life is about to change drastically.

Cast

Tia Lee as Yeh Hsin   
Ray Chang as Lin Miao 
Hsieh Tsu-wu as Yeh Ching-hsiao 
Josie Leung as Dr. Alice
Hero Tai as Li Wei 
Antony Kuo as Chi Hsiao-feng (Chi-ge)
Richard Shen as Li Shu
Christina Tseng as One of Yeh Hsin's personalities
Jasmine Chen as Mi Chu 
Charlene An as Hsia Chih-huan 
Tani Lin as Keng Ti 
Kila Chin as Hsu Mei-chih 
Isabella Chien as Wen Ya-ching 
Nico An as An Chen-yu

References

External links
 

2017 films
Taiwanese crime thriller films
Films about dissociative identity disorder
2017 crime thriller films
2010s mystery thriller films
2017 psychological thriller films
Films based on Taiwanese novels
2010s Mandarin-language films